Cyanotarus is a genus of beetles in the family Carabidae, containing the following species:

 Cyanotarus andinus (Germain, 1855)
 Cyanotarus foveolatus Chaudoir, 1876

References

Lebiinae